Club Deportivo Lalín is a Spanish football team based in Lalín, in the autonomous community of Galicia. Founded in 1974, nowadays it plays in Preferente Autonómica – Group Sur, holding home matches at Estadio Manuel Anxo Cortizo, with a capacity of 8,000 seats.

Season to season

6 seasons in Segunda División B
24 seasons in Tercera División

Notable former players
 Martin Wolfswinkel
 Luis César
  Samuel Mendes
  Jonathan Centeno

Notable former managers
 Fernando Vázquez

External links
CD Lalin News  
Team Info  

Football clubs in Galicia (Spain)
Association football clubs established in 1974
Divisiones Regionales de Fútbol clubs
1974 establishments in Spain